Plaza del Norte is a  shopping center located in Hatillo, Puerto Rico currently owned and managed by Retail Value, Inc. It is the largest shopping center in northwestern Puerto Rico, with over 130 stores and fast food restaurants.

History
Plaza del Norte opened its doors in 1992. In 2005 the mall was acquired by DDR Corp. from a $1.15 billion portfolio deal with Caribbean Property Group (CPG) which included the mall.

During the mid to late 2000s, the mall started to lose many of its tenants. The Cinevista Theatre and Pueblo Supermarkets were closed after their respective parent companies went bankrupt. Party City and Pitusa, which, along with Pueblo, occupied the strip mall area, also left . This led to that part of the mall becoming nearly fully vacant, as the smaller stores and Casa Febus relocated to the enclosed mall. The opening and later expansion of the Puerto Rico Premium Outlets in Barceloneta, led to many stores to open in this outlet mall than in Plaza del Norte. In the JCPenney wing, several formerly small stores were combined into a Circuit City in 2008, but the chain's bankruptcy led to the store being closed a year later. The space was temporarily used by Casa Febus, until it moved to a new building outside the mall. 

In 2011, DDR Corp. announced a significant interior and exterior renovation of the mall, including a 10,000-square-foot expansion and renovation of the existing J.C. Penney Co. store, which now occupies part of the JCPenney wing, including the former Circuit City. The project included the addition of a Rooms To Go, the combination of three small retail-space units to accommodate a PetSmart, several other new stores and outparcels, a new Caribbean Cinemas movie theater and new carts and kiosks through the entire mall. The project was completed in mid-2013.

In early October 2015, Walmart left the mall for a Supercenter. 

In 2017 DDR Corp. spun off its Puerto Rican shopping centers to RVI (Retail Value Inc.) due to struggles they had after the Hurricane Maria, making Retail Value Inc. the new owner of the mall at the time.

In November 2019 an Econo supermarket opened a store in Plaza del Norte.

On October 30, 2020, a new Burlington Coat Factory opened in the former space of Walmart.

In February 2021, it was announced that Sears would be closing in April 2021, along with the locations at Mayaguez Mall, Las Catalinas Mall and Plaza Carolina.

In August 2021 Developers Diversified (DDR Corp.) came back to the PR retail landscape with a $550 million deal with RVI which Plaza del Norte was included in, making DDR the owner of the mall once again.

Current Anchors
JCPenney
TJ Maxx
Caribbean Cinemas 
Burlington Coat Factory
Supermercados Econo
Office Max
PetSmart
Rooms To Go

Former Anchors
Sears
Walmart
A'GACI
Circuit City

Gallery

References 

Shopping malls in Puerto Rico
Shopping malls established in 1992
Hatillo, Puerto Rico